Albin Romain Hodža (also spelled Hodzha; born 7 February 1988) is an Albanian footballer who played as a forward.

Career
Born in Choisy-le-Roi, a suburb of Paris, Hodža was signed by Serie A club Udinese youth team in January 2007. He also wore no.23 shirt of the first team and appeared as unused sub in round 37 against A.C. Milan.

In January 2008, he was loaned to Paganese along with Alessandro Osso Armellino. In the next season, at first he left for Manfredonia, then on 2 February 2008 sold to Sorrento in co-ownership deal, as part of the transfer that Giovanni Barreca joined the Udine-based club.

On 25 June 2008 Sorrento signed him outright and Hodža signed a new 2-year deal with club. On 28 August 2009 he was loaned to Vico Equense along with Pasquale Chiariello.

In summer 2010, he was released, and he joined Serie D club Real Nocera Superiore, which also his 4th Campania based club.

In January Hodža signed for Albanian Superliga side Flamurtari Vlorë as a free agent after leaving SHB Đà Nẵng.

Personal life 
Born in France, Hodža is of Albanian descent.

References

External links
 
 Albin Romain Hodza at Football.it 
 Albin Romain Hodza at LaSerieD.com 

French footballers
French expatriate footballers
French people of Albanian descent
Udinese Calcio players
Manfredonia Calcio players
A.S.D. Sorrento players
PFC Pirin Gotse Delchev players
FC Lyubimets players
First Professional Football League (Bulgaria) players
Association football forwards
Expatriate footballers in Italy
Expatriate footballers in Bulgaria
French expatriate sportspeople in Italy
Footballers from Val-de-Marne
1988 births
Living people